David Fay (December 13, 1761June 5, 1827) was a Vermont judge and militia officer who served on the Vermont Supreme Court and as Adjutant General of the Vermont Militia.

Early life
David Fay was born in Hardwick, Massachusetts on December 13, 1761. His father Stephen Fay, owner of Bennington's Catamount Tavern and one of the founders of Vermont, relocated the family to Bennington in 1766. David Fay served in the Vermont Militia as a fifer during the American Revolution, and took part in the Battle of Bennington as a member of Captain Samuel Robinson's Company.  His brother Joseph Fay also served in the Green Mountain Boys and took part in the Battle of Bennington, and later served as Secretary of State of Vermont.  His brother Jonas Fay was also a member of the Green Mountain Boys, and served in several government positions during Vermont's early years, including Justice of the Vermont Supreme Court.

Career
Fay was a farmer and surveyor. He later studied law, and attained admission to the bar in 1794.

A Democratic-Republican, he served as Bennington County State's attorney from 1795 to 1798,and again from 1800 to 1801. and was a member of the state Council of Censors in 1799 and 1806. From 1801 to 1809 Fay served as United States Attorney for Vermont.

In 1809 Fay was appointed to the Vermont Supreme Court, and he served until 1813.

From 1817 to 1821 he was a member of the Vermont Governor's Council, and he served as Bennington County's Judge of Probate from 1819 to 1820.

Military service
Following the Revolution, Fay continued his service in the militia.  He attained the rank of major in the early 1790s and was a colonel by the late 1790s. In 1795 he was appointed Adjutant General of the Vermont Militia with the rank of major general.  He held this position until 1822.

During the War of 1812 Fay coordinated the activities of the Vermont Militia, including units dispatched to provide security on the Vermont-Canada border and units which took part in the defense of Plattsburgh.

Death and burial
Fay died in Bennington on June 5, 1827 and was buried in the Old Bennington Cemetery.

References

1761 births
1827 deaths
People from Bennington, Vermont
Vermont militiamen in the American Revolution
American militiamen in the War of 1812
American militia generals
Vermont Democratic-Republicans
Vermont lawyers
State's attorneys in Vermont
Vermont state court judges
Justices of the Vermont Supreme Court
United States Attorneys for the District of Vermont
People from Hardwick, Massachusetts
Farmers from Vermont
American surveyors
Burials in Vermont
19th-century American lawyers
Military personnel from Massachusetts